Pallotta is an Italian surname. Notable people with the surname include:

Dan Pallotta (born 1961), American businessman
Emidio Pallotta (1803–1868), Italian painter and architect
Gabriella Pallotta (born 1938), Italian actress
Giovanni Battista Maria Pallotta (1594–1668), Italian cardinal
Giovanni Evangelista Pallotta (1548–1620), Italian cardinal
Guglielmo Pallotta (1727–1795), Italian cardinal
James Pallotta (born 1958), American businessman
Blessed Maria Assunta Pallotta (1878–1905), Italian Roman Catholic professed religious 
Leonida Pallotta (born 1910), Italian footballer
Ryan Pallotta (born 1985), Canadian music video director
Tommy Pallotta (born 1968), American film director and producer

Italian-language surnames